Matthew Emory Hazeltine, Jr. (August 2, 1933 – January 13, 1987) was a professional American football linebacker who played fifteen seasons in the National Football League with the San Francisco 49ers and New York Giants.

Hazeltine was a 1951 graduate of Tamalpais High School in Mill Valley, California, and was a star player there and at the University of California, Berkeley. He was elected to the College Football Hall of Fame in 1989.

While with the 49ers, Hazeltine was selected for the Pro Bowl twice, in 1963 and 1965. He was captain of the team for five years.

Hazeltine missed the 1969 season with injuries, but returned in 1970 for one season with the New York Giants. Following his retirement from the gridiron, Hazeltine operated a successful insurance agency in San Francisco.

He died in San Francisco on January 13, 1987. He was one of three 1964 San Francisco 49ers teammates who died of amyotrophic lateral sclerosis (ALS), also known as Lou Gehrig's Disease. The other two were Bob Waters and Gary Lewis.

See also
 1954 College Football All-America Team

Notes

1933 births
1987 deaths
Players of American football from San Francisco
American football linebackers
California Golden Bears football players
San Francisco 49ers players
New York Giants players
Western Conference Pro Bowl players
College Football Hall of Fame inductees
Neurological disease deaths in California
Deaths from motor neuron disease
Tamalpais High School alumni
People from Ross, California